Baldinucci is a surname. Notable people with the surname include:

Anthony Baldinucci (1665–1717), an Italian Jesuit priest and missionary
Filippo Baldinucci (1625–1696), an Italian art historian and biographer
Pietro Paolo Baldinucci, Italian painter of the Renaissance, active in Gubbio

See also
Artists in biographies by Filippo Baldinucci (1610–1670), major art biography of Baroque painters
Baldini
Balducci (disambiguation)

de:Baldinucci